The first duke of Estonia  ( ) was appointed in 1220 by King Valdemar II of Denmark after the Danish conquest of Estonia during the Livonian crusade. The title was resumed by the kings of Denmark since 1269. During the 1266-82 reign of the queen dowager Margaret Sambiria, the title lady of Estonia was used.

In 1332, after Christopher II died, his second son Otto inherited the title of the duke of Estonia. Valdemar III assumed the title in 1338.

The dukes of Estonia rarely resided in Estonia. To govern the Duchy of Estonia, the king of Denmark and royal counsellors appointed the Lieutenant, who resided in Reval.

The king of Denmark sold the duchy to the Teutonic Order in 1346, but Christian I reassumed the title of duke of Estonia in 1456.

After the Livonian War, Estonia became part of the Swedish Empire, and the title was gained by kings of Sweden. Crown Prince Gustav Adolph was already Duke of Estonia 1607-1611 before he became King, but then officially abolished all Swedish duchies in 1618.

The title was resumed by the Russian tsars after the Great Northern War and Treaty of Nystad when Estonia became part of the Russian Empire. The last duke of Estonia was Nicholas II of Russia.

References

Estonia
Estonia
1220 establishments in Europe
13th-century establishments in Estonia